Youssef El Jebli (born 27 December 1992) is a Dutch professional footballer who plays as a center forward for Saudi Arabian club Ohod. Besides the Netherlands, he has played in Saudi Arabia.

Career 
Youssef was born in Utrecht in the Netherlands to a Moroccan family of 5 children. He grew up in Overvecht County and was enrolled by his father into his hometown club VV De Dreef at the age of six. He left the club four seasons later due to several scouts observing other club players, preventing El Yebli from being seen by the larger clubs. He then joined USV Elinkwijk, the most famous amateur club in Utrecht. He said: “I told myself that if Ibrahim Afellay, Ismail Aissati and Zakaria Labyad had their chances in this club, why not me? But that was not the case. " He left the club a season later to transfer to USV Hercules. In July 2010, he develops with the USV Hercules club - 19 years, during which he will play there for 3 seasons before making his official debut in team A.

in the 2014/15 season, El-Yebli moved free of charge from USV Hercules to Club Linden, with whom he won the third division and the “general amateur championship”. El-Yebli then moved to De Graafschap for 50,000 euros.

In the first game of the 2015/16 season for De Graafschap against Herenveen, El-Yebli made his Eredivisie debut, replacing Nathan Kabasele in the 70th minute. Coach Jan Vreman promises Youssef El-Yebli a lot of playing time. In his first season, he played 31 matches in the Eredivisie, and his team was relegated to the first division. In the following season 2016/17, he scored four goals in the first division. In the 2017/18 season, he achieved outstanding results with 9 goals and 14 assists in 42 games, and his team was able to advance to the Eredivisie. On May 16, 2018, El-Yebli signed a two-year contract with the club.

On 23 August 2019, El-Yebli signed a two-year contract with Al-Faisaly from Saudi Arabia.

On 8 January 2023, El-Jebli joined Ohod on a six-month contract.

Personal life
Born in the Netherlands, El Jebli is of Moroccan descent.

References

External links
 
 

1992 births
Living people
Association football midfielders
Dutch footballers
Dutch sportspeople of Moroccan descent
Dutch expatriate footballers
Hercules players
FC Lienden players
De Graafschap players
Al-Faisaly FC players
Al Batin FC players
Ohod Club players
Eredivisie players
Eerste Divisie players
Saudi Professional League players
Saudi First Division League players
Footballers from Utrecht (city)
Dutch expatriate sportspeople in Saudi Arabia
Expatriate footballers in Saudi Arabia
USV Hercules players